This is a list of Pathfinder books for the Pathfinder Roleplaying Game fantasy role-playing game.

Pathfinder Roleplaying Game First Edition

Pathfinder Roleplaying Game Rulebooks

Pathfinder Adventure Paths

Pathfinder Modules

Pathfinder Player Companion Sourcebooks 
32-page monthly installments exploring the major themes in the Pathfinder campaign setting including: expanded regional gazetteers, new player options, and organizational overviews to help players flesh out their character backgrounds and to provide players and Game Masters with new sources for campaign intrigue.

Pathfinder Campaign Setting Sourcebooks

Pathfinder Second Edition (PF2e)

Pathfinder Rulebooks (2e)

Pathfinder Lost Omens (2e) books
The Pathfinder Lost Omens line details the established universe of the Pathfinder Roleplaying Game which is used for the official adventures released by Paizo. It details subjects ranging from its universe's pantheons to its nations.

Pathfinder Adventure (2e) books

Pathfinder Adventure Path (2e) books

References

External links 
 Pathfinder - official site

Pathfinder
Pathfinder
Pathfinder